Jake Hummel (born January 4, 1999) is an American football inside linebacker for the Los Angeles Rams of the National Football League (NFL). He played college football at  Iowa State.

College career
Hummel played for the Iowa State Cyclones for five seasons. He finished his collegiate career with 228 tackles, 18 tackles for loss, two sacks, and three interceptions.

Professional career
Hummel signed with the Los Angeles Rams as an undrafted free agent on May 5, 2022. He made the Rams' initial 53-man roster out of training camp. He was placed on injured reserve on November 5, 2022.

References

External links
Iowa State Cyclones bio
Los Angeles Rams bio

Living people
Players of American football from Iowa
American football linebackers
Iowa State Cyclones football players
Los Angeles Rams players
1999 births